Seth Collins (born October 10, 1996) is an American football defensive back who formerly played for the Oregon State Beavers. Collins transferred to Texas Tech Football for the 2018 season.

Early years
Collins attended Christian High School San Diego in El Cajon, California as a freshman and Helix High School in La Mesa, California as a sophomore before transferring to Granite Hills High School in El Cajon prior to his junior year. As a senior, he passed for 1,013 yards, rushed for 988 and accounted for 29 touchdowns. Collins committed to Oregon State University to play college football.

College career
Collins was named Oregon State's starting quarterback as a true freshman in 2015. In his first career start he passed for 92 yards and two passing touchdowns and rushed for 152 yards on 17 carries. Prior to 2016 he switched to wide receiver. Collins suffered a shoulder injury during spring practices prior to the 2019 season, missing the entire season. After an appeal to the NCAA, Collins was granted a sixth year of eligibility and was able to play for the 2020 season. Prior to the 2020 season, Collins switched from wide receiver to defensive back. Collins suffered a shoulder injury against Iowa State on October 10 and was out for the remainder of the season.

Statistics

References

External links
Oregon State Beavers bio
 Texas Tech bio

1996 births
Living people
Players of American football from San Diego
American football quarterbacks
American football wide receivers
Oregon State Beavers football players
Texas Tech Red Raiders football players